Greater Iran refers to a sociocultural region in which Iranian traditions and Iranian languages have had a significant impact. It spans parts of Western Asia, the Caucasus, Central Asia, South Asia, and Xinjiang. The region is defined by having been long-ruled by the dynasties of various Iranian empires, under whom the local populaces gradually incorporated some degree of Iranian influence into their cultural and/or linguistic traditions; or alternatively as where a considerable number of Iranian peoples settled to still maintain communities who patronize their respective cultures, geographically corresponding to the areas surrounding the Iranian plateau. It is referred to as the "Iranian Cultural Continent" by Encyclopædia Iranica.

The concept of Greater Iran primarily bases itself on the legacy of the Achaemenid Persian Empire. It has notably served as a core motivation for pan-Iranism, a political ideology advocating the amalgamation of the region at large.

Throughout the 16th–19th centuries, Iran lost many of the territories that had been conquered under the Safavids and Qajars. The Ottoman–Iranian Wars resulted in the loss of present-day Iraq to the Ottoman Empire, as outlined in the Treaty of Amasya in 1555 and the Treaty of Zuhab in 1639. Simultaneously, the Russo-Iranian Wars resulted in the loss of the Caucasus to the Russian Empire: the Treaty of Gulistan in 1813 saw Iran cede present-day Dagestan, Georgia, and most of Azerbaijan; and the Treaty of Turkmenchay in 1828 saw Iran cede present-day Armenia, the remainder of Azerbaijan, and Iğdır, setting the northern boundary along the Aras River. Parts of Afghanistan were lost to the British Empire through the Treaty of Paris in 1857 and the McMahon Arbitration in 1905.

Etymology
The name "Iran", meaning "land of the Aryans", is the New Persian continuation of the old genitive plural aryānām (proto-Iranian, meaning "of the Aryans"), first attested in the Avesta as airyānąm (the text of which is composed in Avestan, an old Iranian language spoken in northeastern Greater Iran, or in what are now Afghanistan, Uzbekistan, Turkmenistan and Tajikistan). The proto-Iranian term aryānām is present in the term Airyana Vaēǰah, the homeland of Zoroaster and Zoroastrianism, near the provinces of Sogdiana, Margiana, Bactria, etc., listed in the first chapter of the Vidēvdād. The Avestan evidence is confirmed by Greek sources: Arianē is spoken of as being between Persia and the Indian subcontinent. However, this is a Greek pronunciation of the name Haroyum/Haraiva (Herat), which the Greeks called 'Aria' (a land listed separately from the homeland of the Aryans).

While up until the end of the Parthian period in the 3rd century CE, the idea of "Irān" had an ethnic, linguistic, and religious value, it did not yet have a political import. The idea of an "Iranian" empire or kingdom in a political sense is a purely Sasanian one. It was the result of a convergence of interests between the new dynasty and the Zoroastrian clergy, as we can deduce from the available evidence. This convergence gave rise to the idea of an Ērān-šahr "Kingdom of the Iranians", which was "ēr" (Middle Persian equivalent of Old Persian "ariya" and Avestan "airya").

Definition
Richard Nelson Frye defines Greater Iran as including "much of the Caucasus, Iraq, Afghanistan, Pakistan and Central Asia, with cultural influences extending to China and western India." According to Frye, "Iran means all lands and peoples where Iranian languages were and are spoken, and where in the past, multi-faceted Iranian cultures existed."

Richard Foltz notes that while "A general assumption is often made that the various Iranian peoples of 'greater Iran'—a cultural area that stretched from Mesopotamia and the Caucasus into Khwarizm, Transoxiana, Bactria, and the Pamirs and included Persians, Medes, Parthians and Sogdians among others—were all 'Zoroastrians' in pre-Islamic times... This view, even though common among serious scholars, is almost certainly overstated." Foltz argues that "While the various Iranian peoples did indeed share a common pantheon and pool of religious myths and symbols, in actuality a variety of deities were worshipped—particularly Mitra, the god of covenants, and Anahita, the goddess of the waters, but also many others—depending on the time, place, and particular group concerned".
To the Ancient Greeks, Greater Iran ended at the Indus River located in Pakistan.

According to J. P. Mallory and Douglas Q. Adams most of Western greater Iran spoke Southwestern Iranian languages in the Achaemenid era while the Eastern territory spoke Eastern Iranian languages related to Avestan.

George Lane also states that after the dissolution of the Mongol Empire, the Ilkhanids became rulers of greater Iran and Uljaytu, according to Judith G. Kolbas, was the ruler of this expanse between 1304 and 1317 A.D.

Primary sources, including Timurid historian Mir Khwand, define Iranshahr (Greater Iran) as extending from the Euphrates to the Oxus

Traditionally, and until recent times, ethnicity has never been a defining separating criterion in these regions. In the words of Richard Nelson Frye:

Only in modern times did western colonial intervention and ethnicity tend to become a dividing force between the provinces of Greater Iran. As Patrick Clawson states, "ethnic nationalism is largely a nineteenth-century phenomenon, even if it is fashionable to retroactively extend it." "Greater Iran" however has been more of a cultural super-state, rather than a political one to begin with.

In the work Nuzhat al-Qolub, the medieval geographer Hamdallah Mustawfi wrote:

Some cities in Iran are above the rest,

better and more productive due to good weather,

Ganja full of treasure in Arran, and Esfahān in Iraq,

Merv and Tus in Khorasan, and Aksaray in Rûm.

The Cambridge History of Iran takes a geographical approach in referring to the "historical and cultural" entity of "Greater Iran" as "areas of Iran, parts of Afghanistan, and Chinese and Soviet Central Asia". A detailed list of these territories follows in this article.

Background

Greater Iran is called Iranzamin which means "Iranland" or "The Land of Iran". Iranzamin was in the mythical times as opposed to the Turanzamin the Land of Turan, which was located in the upper part of Central Asia.

In the pre-Islamic period, Iranians distinguished two main regions in the territory they ruled, one Iran and the other Aniran. By Iran they meant all the regions inhabited by ancient Iranian peoples, this region was more extensive in the past. This notion of Iran as a territory (opposed to Aniran) can be seen as the core of early Greater Iran. Later many changes occurred in the boundaries and areas where Iranians lived but the languages and culture remained the dominant medium in many parts of Greater Iran.

As an example, the Persian language (referred to, in Persian, as Farsi) was the main literary language and the language of correspondence in Central Asia and the Caucasus prior to the Russian occupation, Central Asia being the birthplace of modern Persian language. Furthermore, according to the British government, Persian language was also used in Iraqi Kurdistan, prior to the British Occupation and Mandate in 1918–1932.

With Imperial Russia continuously advancing south in the course of two wars against Persia, and the treaties of Turkmenchay and Gulistan in the western frontiers, plus the unexpected death of Abbas Mirza in 1833, and the murdering of Persia's Grand Vizier (Mirza AbolQasem Qa'im Maqām), many Central Asian khanates began losing hope for any support from Persia against the Tsarist armies. The Russian armies occupied the Aral coast in 1849, Tashkent in 1864, Bukhara in 1867, Samarkand in 1868, and Khiva and Amudarya in 1873.

"Many Iranians consider their natural sphere of influence to extend beyond Iran's present borders. After all, Iran was once much larger. Portuguese forces seized islands and ports in the 16th and 17th centuries. In the 19th century, the Russian Empire wrested from Tehran's control what is today Armenia, Republic of Azerbaijan, and part of Georgia. Iranian elementary school texts teach about the Iranian roots not only of cities like Baku, but also cities further north like Derbent in southern Russia. The Shah lost much of his claim to western Afghanistan following the Anglo-Iranian war of 1856-1857. Only in 1970 did a UN sponsored consultation end Iranian claims to suzerainty over the Persian Gulf island nation of Bahrain. In centuries past, Iranian rule once stretched westward into modern Iraq and beyond. When the western world complains of Iranian interference beyond its borders, the Iranian government often convinced itself that it is merely exerting its influence in lands that were once its own. Simultaneously, Iran's losses at the hands of outside powers have contributed to a sense of grievance that continues to the present day." -Patrick Clawson of the Washington Institute for Near East Policy

"Iran today is just a rump of what it once was. At its height, Iranian rulers controlled Iraq, Afghanistan, Western Pakistan, much of Central Asia, and the Caucasus. Many Iranians today consider these areas part of a greater Iranian sphere of influence." -Patrick Clawson

"Since the days of the Achaemenids, the Iranians had the protection of geography. But high mountains and the vast emptiness of the Iranian plateau were no longer enough to shield Iran from the Russian army or British navy. Both literally, and figuratively, Iran shrank. At the beginning of the nineteenth century, Azerbaijan, Armenia, and Afghanistan were Iranian, but by the end of the century, all this territory had been lost as a result of European military action."

Regions
In the 8th century, Iran was conquered by the Abbassids who ruled from Baghdad. The territory of Iran at that time was composed of two portions: Persian Iraq (western portion) and Khorasan (eastern portion). The dividing region was mostly the cities of Gurgan and Damaghan. The Ghaznavids, Seljuqs and Timurids divided their empires into Iraqi and Khorasani regions. This point can be observed in many books such as Abul Fazl Bayhqi's "Tārīkhi Baïhaqī", Al-Ghazali's Faza'ilul al-anam min rasa'ili hujjat al-Islam and other books. Transoxiana and Chorasmia were mostly included in the Khorasanian region.

Western Asia

Bahrain

The "Ajam" and "Huwala" are ethnic communities of Bahrain of Persian origin. The Persians of Bahrain are a significant, influential ethnic community whose ancestors arrived in Bahrain within the last 1,000 years as laborers, merchants and artisans. They have traditionally been merchants living in specific quarters of Manama and Muharraq. Bahrain's Persians who adhere to the Shia sect of Islam are called Ajam and the Persians who adhere to the Sunni sect are called the Huwala; who migrated from Larestan in Iran to the Persian Gulf in the seventeenth and eighteenth century.

The immigration of Persians to Bahrain began with the fall of the Greek Seleucid kingdom, which ruled the island at the time. The Persian Empire successfully invaded, but it is often believed that mass immigration began much later, during the 1600s, when the Safavid shah Abbas the Great conquered Bahrain. After settlement, some of the Persians were effectively Arabized. They usually settled in areas inhabited by the indigenous Baharna, probably because they share the same Shia Muslim faith, however, some Sunni Persians settled in areas mostly inhabited by Sunni Arab immigrants such as Hidd and Galali. In Muharraq, they have their own neighborhood called Fareej Karimi named after a rich Persian man called Ali Abdulla Karimi.

From the 6th century BC to the 3rd century BC, Bahrain was a prominent part of the Persian Empire by the Achaemenids dynasty. It was referred to by the Greeks as "Tylos", the centre of pearl trading, when Nearchus discovered it while serving under Alexander the Great. From the 3rd century BC to the arrival of Islam in the 7th century AD, the island was controlled by two other Iranian dynasties, the Parthians and the Sassanids.

In the 3rd century AD, the Sassanids succeeded the Parthians and controlled the area for four centuries until the Arab conquest. Ardashir, the first ruler of the Iranian Sassanid dynasty marched to Oman and Bahrain and defeated Sanatruq (or Satiran), probably the Parthian governor of Bahrain. He appointed his son Shapur I as governor. Shapur constructed a new city there and named it Batan Ardashir after his father. At this time, it incorporated the southern Sassanid province covering the Persian Gulf's southern shore plus the archipelago of Bahrain. The southern province of the Sassanids was subdivided into three districts; Haggar (now al-Hafuf province, Saudi Arabia), Batan Ardashir (now al-Qatif province, Saudi Arabia), and Mishmahig (now Bahrain Island) (In Middle-Persian/Pahlavi it means "ewe-fish").

By about 130 BC, the Parthian dynasty brought the Persian Gulf under their control and extended their influence as far as Oman. Because they needed to control the Persian Gulf trade route, the Parthians established garrisons along the southern coast of the Persian Gulf.
through warfare and economic distress, been reduced to only 60. 
The influence of Iran was further undermined at the end of the 18th century when the ideological power struggle between the Akhbari-Usuli strands culminated in victory for the Usulis in Bahrain.

An Afghan uprising led by Hotakis of Kandahar at the beginning of the 18th century resulted in the near-collapse of the Safavid state. In the resultant power vacuum, Oman invaded Bahrain in 1717, ending over one hundred years of Persian hegemony in Bahrain. The Omani invasion began a period of political instability and a quick succession of outside rulers took power with consequent destruction. According to a contemporary account by theologian, Sheikh Yusuf Al Bahrani, in an unsuccessful attempt by the Persians and their Bedouin allies to take back Bahrain from the Kharijite Omanis, much of the country was burnt to the ground. Bahrain was eventually sold back to the Persians by the Omanis, but the weakness of the Safavid empire saw Huwala tribes seize control.

In 1730, the new Shah of Persia, Nadir Shah, sought to re-assert Persian sovereignty in Bahrain. He ordered Latif Khan, the admiral of the Persian navy in the Persian Gulf, to prepare an invasion fleet in Bushehr. The Persians invaded in March or early April 1736 when the ruler of Bahrain, Shaikh Jubayr, was away on hajj. The invasion brought the island back under central rule and to challenge Oman in the Persian Gulf. He sought help from the British and Dutch, and he eventually recaptured Bahrain in 1736. During the Qajar era, Persian control over Bahrain waned and in 1753, Bahrain was occupied by the Sunni Persians of the Bushire-based Al Madhkur family, who ruled Bahrain in the name of Persia and paid allegiance to Karim Khan Zand.

During most of the second half of the eighteenth century, Bahrain was ruled by Nasr Al-Madhkur, the ruler of Bushehr. The Bani Utibah tribe from Zubarah exceeded in taking over Bahrain after war broke out in 1782. Persian attempts to reconquer the island in 1783 and in 1785 failed; the 1783 expedition was a joint Persian-Qawasim invasion force that never left Bushehr. The 1785 invasion fleet, composed of forces from Bushehr, Rig, and Shiraz was called off after the death of the ruler of Shiraz, Ali Murad Khan. Due to internal difficulties, the Persians could not attempt another invasion. In 1799, Bahrain came under threat from the expansionist policies of Sayyid Sultan, the Sultan of Oman, when he invaded the island under the pretext that Bahrain did not pay taxes owed. The Bani Utbah solicited the aid of Bushire to expel the Omanis on the condition that Bahrain would become a tributary state of Persia. In 1800, Sayyid Sultan invaded Bahrain again in retaliation and deployed a garrison at Arad Fort, in Muharraq island and had appointed his twelve-year-old son Salim, as Governor of the island.

Many names of villages in Bahrain are derived from the Persian language. These names were thought to have been as a result influences during the Safavid rule of Bahrain (1501–1722) and previous Persian rule. Village names such as Karbabad, Salmabad, Karzakan, Duraz, Barbar were originally derived from the Persian language, suggesting that Persians had a substantial effect on the island's history. The local Bahrani Arabic dialect has also borrowed many words from the Persian language. Bahrain's capital city, Manama is derived from two Persian words meaning 'I' and 'speech'.

In 1910, the Persian community funded and opened a private school, Al-Ittihad school, that taught Farsi amongst other subjects.
According to the 1905 census, there were 1650 Bahraini citizens of Persian origin.

Historian Nasser Hussain says that many Iranians fled their native country in the early 20th century due to a law king Reza Shah issued which banned women from wearing the hijab, or because they feared for their lives after fighting the English or to find jobs. They were coming to Bahrain from Bushehr and the Fars province between 1920 and 1940. In the 1920s, local Persian merchants were prominently involved in the consolidation of Bahrain's first powerful lobby with connections to the municipality in an effort to contest the municipal legislation of British control.

Bahrain's local Persian community has heavily influenced the country's local food dishes. One of the most notable local delicacies of the people in Bahrain is mahyawa, consumed in Southern Iran as well, is a watery earth brick coloured sauce made from sardines and consumed with bread or other food. Bahrain's Persians are also famous in Bahrain for bread-making. Another local delicacy is "pishoo" made from rose water (golab) and agar agar. Other food items consumed are similar to Persian cuisine.

Iraq

Throughout history, Iran always had strong cultural ties with the region of present-day Iraq. Mesopotamia is considered the cradle of civilization and the place where the first empires in history were established. These empires, namely the Sumerian, Akkadian, Babylonian, and Assyrian, dominated the ancient middle east for millennia, which explains the great influence of Mesopotamia on the Iranian culture and history, and it is also the reason why the later Iranian and Greek dynasties chose Mesopotamia to be the political center of their rule. For a period of around 500 years, what is now Iraq formed the core of Iran, with the Iranian Parthian and Sasanian empire having their capital in what is modern-day Iraq for the same centuries-long time span. (Ctesiphon)

According to Iranologist Richard N. Frye:

Testimony to the close relationship shared by Iraq and western Iran during the Abbasid era and later centuries, is the fact that the two regions came to share the same name. The western region of Iran (ancient Media) was called 'Irāq-e 'Ajamī ("Persian Iraq"), while central-southern Iraq (Babylonia) was called 'Irāq al-'Arabī ("Arabic Iraq") or Bābil ("Babylon").

For centuries the two neighbouring regions were known as "The Two Iraqs" ("al-'Iraqain"). The 12th century Persian poet Khāqāni wrote a famous poem Tohfat-ul Iraqein ("The Gift of the Two Iraqs"). The city of Arāk in western Iran still bears the region's old name, and Iranians still traditionally call the region between Tehran, Isfahan and Īlām "ʿErāq".

During the medieval ages, Mesopotamian and Iranian peoples knew each other's languages because of trade, and because Arabic was the language of religion and science at that time. The Timurid historian Ḥāfeẓ-e Abru (d. 1430) wrote of Iraq:

Iraqis share religious and certain cultural ties with Iranians. The majority of Iranians are Twelver Shia (an Islamic sect established in Iraq), although the majority of Iranians were Sunni Muslims and did not convert to Shia until the Safavids forced Shi'ism in Iran.

Iraqi culture has commonalities with the culture of Iran. The Mesopotamian cuisine also has similarities to the Persian cuisine, including common dishes and cooking techniques. The Iraqi dialect has absorbed many words from the Persian language.

There are still cities and provinces in Iraq where the Persian names of the city are still retained – e.g., ’Anbār and Baghdad. Other cities of Iraq with originally Persian names include Nokard (نوكرد) --> Haditha, Suristan (سورستان) --> Kufa, Shahrban (شهربان) --> Muqdadiyah, Arvandrud (اروندرود) --> Shatt al-Arab, and Asheb (آشب) --> Amadiya, Peroz-Shapur --> Anbar (town)

In the modern era, the Safavid dynasty of Iran briefly reasserted hegemony over Iraq in the periods of 1501–1533 and 1622–1638, losing Iraq to the Ottoman Empire on both occasions (via the Treaty of Amasya in 1555 and the Treaty of Zuhab in 1639). Ottoman hegemony over Iraq was reconfirmed in the Treaty of Kerden in 1746.

Following the fall of the Ba'athist regime in 2003 and the empowerment of Iraq's majority Shī'i community, relations with Iran have flourished in all fields. Iraq is today Iran's largest trading partner in regard to non-oil goods.

Many Iranians were born in Iraq or have ancestors from Iraq, such as the Chairman of Iran's Parliament Ali Larijani, the former Chief Justice of Iran Mahmoud Hashemi Shahroudi, and the Minister of Foreign Affairs of Iran Ali Akbar Salehi, who were born in Najaf and Karbala respectively. In the same way, many Iraqis were born in Iran or have ancestors from Iran, such as Grand Ayatollah Ali al-Sistani, who was born in Mashhad.

Kurdistan
Culturally and historically Kurdistan has been a part of what is known as Greater Iran. Kurds speak a Northwestern Iranian language known as Kurdish. Many aspects of Kurdish culture are related to the other peoples of Greater Iran, examples include Newroz and Simurgh. Some historians and linguists, such as Vladimir Minorsky, have suggested that the Medes, an Iranian people who inhabited much of western Iran, including Azerbaijan and Kurdistan, might have been forefathers of modern Kurds.

Caucasus

North Caucasus

Dagestan remains the bastion of Persian culture in the North Caucasus with fine examples of Iranian architecture like the Sassanid citadel in Derbent, the strong influence of Persian cuisine, and common Persian names amongst the ethnic peoples of Dagestan. The ethnic Persian population of the North Caucasus, the Tats, remain, despite strong assimilation over the years, still visible in several North Caucasian cities. Even today, after decades of partition, some of these regions retain Iranian influences, as seen in their old beliefs, traditions and customs (e.g. Norouz).

South Caucasus

According to Tadeusz Swietochowski, the territories of Iran and the republic of Azerbaijan usually shared the same history from the time of ancient Media (ninth to seventh centuries b.c.) and the Persian Empire (sixth to fourth centuries b.c.).

Intimately and inseparably intertwined histories for millennia, Iran irrevocably lost the territory that is nowadays Azerbaijan in the course of the 19th century. With the Treaty of Gulistan of 1813 following the Russo-Persian War (1804-1813) Iran had to cede eastern Georgia, its possessions in the North Caucasus and many of those in what is today the Azerbaijan Republic, which included the khanates of Baku, Shirvan, Karabakh, Ganja, Shaki, Quba, Derbent, and parts of Talysh. These Khanates comprise most of what is today the Republic of Azerbaijan and Dagestan in Southern Russia. In the Treaty of Turkmenchay of 1828 following the Russo-Persian War (1826-1828), the result was even more disastrous, and resulted in Iran being forced to cede the remainder of the Talysh Khanate, the khanates of Nakhichevan and Erivan, and the Mughan region to Russia. All these territories together, lost in 1813 and 1828 combined, constitute all of the modern-day Republic of Azerbaijan, Armenia, and southern Dagestan. The area to the North of the river Aras, among which the territory of the contemporary republic of Azerbaijan were Iranian territory until they were occupied by Russia in the course of the 19th century.

Many localities in this region bear Persian names or names derived from Iranian languages and Azerbaijan remains by far Iran's closest cultural, religious, ethnic, and historical neighbor. Azerbaijanis are by far the second-largest ethnicity in Iran, and comprise the largest community of ethnic Azerbaijanis in the world, vastly outnumbering the number in the Republic of Azerbaijan. Both nations are the only officially Shia majority in the world, with adherents of the religion comprising an absolute majority in both nations. The people of nowadays Iran and Azerbaijan were converted to Shiism during exactly the same time in history. Furthermore, the name of "Azerbaijan" is derived through the name of the Persian satrap which ruled the contemporary region of Iranian Azerbaijan and minor parts of the Republic of Azerbaijan in ancient times. In 1918, the Azerbaijani Musavat party adopted the name for the nation upon the independence of the former territories under the Russian Empire.

Early in antiquity, Narseh of Persia is known to have had fortifications built here. In later times, some of Persia's literary and intellectual figures from the Qajar period have hailed from this region. Under intermittent Iranian suzerainty since antiquity, it was also separated from Iran in the mid-19th century, by virtue of the Gulistan Treaty and Turkmenchay Treaty.

Oh Nakhchivan, respect you've attained,

With this King in luck you'll remain.
---Nizami

Central Asia

Khwarazm is one of the regions of Iran-zameen, and is the home of the ancient Iranians, Airyanem Vaejah, according to the ancient book of the Avesta. Modern scholars believe Khwarazm to be what ancient Avestic texts refer to as "Ariyaneh Waeje" or Iran vij. Iranovich These sources claim that Urgandj, which was the capital of ancient Khwarazm for many years, was actually "Ourva": the eighth land of Ahura Mazda mentioned in the Pahlavi text of Vendidad. Others such as University of Hawaii historian Elton L. Daniel believe Khwarazm to be the "most likely locale" corresponding to the original home of the Avestan people, while Dehkhoda calls Khwarazm "the cradle of the Aryan people" (مهد قوم آریا). Today Khwarazm is split between several central Asian republics.

Superimposed on and overlapping with Chorasmia was Khorasan which roughly covered nearly the same geographical areas in Central Asia (starting from Semnan eastward through northern Afghanistan roughly until the foothills of Pamir, ancient Mount Imeon). Current day provinces such as Sanjan in Turkmenia, Razavi Khorasan Province, North Khorasan Province, and Southern Khorasan Province in Iran are all remnants of the old Khorasan. Until the 13th century and the devastating Mongol invasion of the region, Khorasan was considered the cultural capital of Greater Iran.

Tajikistan
The national anthem in Tajikistan, "Surudi Milli", attests to the Perso-Tajik identity, which has seen a large revival, after the breakup of the USSR. Their language is almost identical to that spoken in Afghanistan and Iran, and their cities have Persian names, e.g. Dushanbe, Isfara, Rasht Valley, Garm, Murghab, Vahdat, Zar-afshan river, Shurab, and Kulob, Rudaki, considered by many as the father of modern Persian poetry, was from the modern day region of Tajikistan.

Turkmenistan
Turkmenistan was the home of the Parthian Empire (Nisa). Merv is also where the half-Persian caliph al-Mamun put his capital. The city of Eshgh Abad (some claim that the word is actually the transformed form of "Ashk Abad" literally meaning "built by Ashk", the head of Arsacid dynasty) is yet another Persian word meaning "city of love", and like East Iran, Afghanistan, and Uzbekistan, it was once part of Airyanem Vaejah.

Uzbekistan
Uzbekistan has a significant local Tajik population. The famous Persian cities of Afrasiab, Bukhara, Samarkand, Shahrisabz, Andijan, Khiveh, Navā'i, Shirin, Termez, and Zar-afshan are located here. These cities are the birthplace of the Islamic era Persian literature. The Samanids, who claimed inheritance to the Sassanids, had their capital built here.

Oh Bukhara! Joy to you and live long!

Your King comes to you in ceremony.
---Rudaki

Afghanistan
The modern state of Afghanistan was part of Sistan and Greater Khorasan regions, and hence was recognized with the name Khorasan (along with regions centered on Merv and Nishapur), which in Pahlavi means "The Eastern Land" (خاور زمین in Persian).

Nowadays, the region of Afghanistan is where Balkh is located, home of Rumi, Rabi'a Balkhi, Sanāī Ghaznawi, Jami, Khwaja Abdullah Ansari and was many other notables in Persian literature came from.

From Zabul he arrived to Kabul

Strutting, happy, and mirthful
---Ferdowsi in Shahnama

Xinjiang

The Tashkurgan Tajik Autonomous County regions of China harbored a Tajik population and culture. Chinese Tashkurgan Tajik Autonomous County was always counted as a part of the Iranian cultural & linguistic continent with Kashgar, Yarkand, and Hotan bound to the Iranian history.

South Asia

Pakistan
There is considerable influence of Iranian-speaking peoples in Pakistan. The region of Baluchistan is split between Pakistan and Iran and Baluchi, the majority of languages of the Baluchistan province of Pakistan are also spoken in Southeastern Iran. In fact, the Chagai Hills and the western part of Makran district were part of Iran till the Durand Line was drawn in the late 1800s.

Pashto which is spoken in Khyber Pakhtunkhwa and FATA of Pakistan and Afghanistan is an Iranian language.

Historical maps of the Iranian state

Treaties and loss of Iranian control
1555 Treaty of Amasya: The first treaty between Safavid Persia and the Ottoman Empire, splitting the Caucasus and Mesopotamia in a Turkish and Persian sphere.
1639 Treaty of Zuhab: Iran loses Iraq to the Ottoman Empire.
1813 Gulestan Treaty: Iran loses a large amount of its land in the Caucasus, including eastern half of Georgia, southern Dagestan, large parts of the Armenian Republic, and most of what is today the Azerbaijan Republic
1828 Turkmenchay Treaty: Signed by Fath Ali Shah. Russia gains sovereignty over the entire Caucasus, including Iran's Nakhichivan, Nagorno-Karabakh, the entirety of Armenia, and the remainder of the modern-day territory of the Republic of Azerbaijan
1857 Paris Treaty: Signed by Nasereddin Shah. Iran renounces all claims to Herat and parts of Afghanistan in exchange for the evacuation of Iran's southern ports by Great Britain.
1881 Akhal Treaty: Signed by Nasereddin Shah. Iran loses Merv and parts of Khwarazmia in exchange for security guarantees from Russia.
1893: Iran transfers to Russia additional regions near the Atrek River that were Iranian under the Akhal Treaty. This treaty was signed by General Boutsoff and Mirza Ali Asghar Amin al-Sultan on May 27, 1893.
1907: Persia was to be carved up into three regions, according to the Anglo-Russian Convention of 1907.
1970: Iran abandons sovereignty rights over Bahrain to Great Britain in exchange for Greater and Lesser Tunbs and Abu Musa islands in the Persian Gulf.

See also

Notes and references

Explanatory footnotes

Citation footnotes

General references
 

 Marcinkowski, Christoph (2010). Shi'ite Identities: Community and Culture in Changing Social Contexts. Berlin: Lit Verlag 2010. .

External links

Iranian nationalism
Cultural regions
Geography of Iran
History of Iran
Iranian culture
Georgia (country)–Iran relations
Azerbaijan–Iran relations
Iran–Pakistan relations
Iran–Iraq relations
Armenia–Iran relations
Afghanistan–Iran relations
Central Asia
Country classifications
Middle East
Western Asia
Historical geography
Historical regions of Iran
Historical regions
Iranian irredentism